Raz Shavit is an Israeli footballer who currently plays at Hapoel Bnei Lod.

Notes

1992 births
Living people
Israeli footballers
Hapoel Bnei Lod F.C. players
Shimshon Kafr Qasim F.C. players
Liga Leumit players
Footballers from Ramla
Association football forwards